ATP2B1 antisense RNA 1 is a protein that in humans is encoded by the ATP2B1-AS1 gene.

References

Further reading